Aaron Craig (born 1992) is an Irish hurler who plays as a centre-back for the Westmeath senior team.

Born in Mullingar, County Westmeath, Craig first arrived on the inter-county scene at the age of seventeen when he first linked up with the Westmeath minor team, before later lining out with the under-21 side. He made his senior debut in the 2011 championship. Craig has since gone on to become a regular member of the starting fifteen.

At club level Craig plays with St Oliver Plunkett's.

Honours

Team
Westmeath
All-Ireland Minor B Hurling Championship (1): 2010

References

1992 births
Living people
Irish Army soldiers
People from Mullingar
St Oliver Plunkett's (Westmeath) hurlers
Westmeath inter-county hurlers